Hugh Kenneth Hill (born June 14, 1937) is the former Ambassador of the United States to Bulgaria from 1990 until 1993 and Chargé d'affaires in Zambia.

Hill graduated from the University of California (B.A., 1959; M.A., 1964).

See also
List of ambassadors of the United States to Bulgaria

References

1937 births
Living people
Ambassadors of the United States to Bulgaria
Ambassadors of the United States to Zambia
University of California alumni
People from Nacogdoches County, Texas